The Eli Morse Sawmill Foundations are the surviving remnant of the first industrial site in Dublin, New Hampshire. The site is located astride a stream, near an old logging road, in a wooded area south of Old Marlborough Road, not far from the Eli Morse Farm. It consists of four foundation walls made of dry laid granite boulders. To the west of the main mill's foundations are smaller foundations of extensions  or outbuildings.

The foundations are the only surviving elements of a sawmill erected c. 1765 by Eli Morse, one of Dublin's first settlers and a prominent participant in the town's civic affairs.  The proprietors of the town offered Morse financial incentives to build the mill in 1764; he is also credited with building the town's first grist mill a few years later.  This mill was operated by Morse and later his son Peter, who died in an accident at the site.  The mill is known to have ceased operation by 1886.

The mill site was listed on the National Register of Historic Places in 1983.

See also
National Register of Historic Places listings in Cheshire County, New Hampshire

References

Industrial buildings and structures on the National Register of Historic Places in New Hampshire
Commercial buildings completed in 1765
Buildings and structures in Dublin, New Hampshire
National Register of Historic Places in Dublin, New Hampshire
Sawmills in the United States